Miralie is a locality in the Rural City of Swan Hill, Victoria, Australia. Miralie Train Station is a grain station on the Piangil railway line. Miralie post office opened on 11 March 1925 and was closed on 22 July 1925.

References

Towns in Victoria (Australia)
Rural City of Swan Hill